Frankton railway station was a station in Ellesmere Rural, Shropshire, England. The station was opened in 1867 and closed on 18 January 1965.

References

Further reading

Disused railway stations in Shropshire
Railway stations in Great Britain opened in 1867
Railway stations in Great Britain closed in 1965
Former Cambrian Railway stations
Beeching closures in England